Mark E. Orazem is an American chemist, focusing electrochemical impedance spectroscopy, energy systems, corrosion and mathematical modeling, currently Distinguished Professor at University of Florida and previously the UF Research Foundation Professor.

References

Year of birth missing (living people)
Living people
University of Florida faculty
American chemical engineers
University of California, Berkeley alumni